Chellay Wala Thall is a village of Jhang District, Punjab Province, Pakistan, situated in the Thal Desert. It is also known as 7/2 Thall Janobi.

The area surrounding the village is totally deserted and sandy. It is a dry desert with little vegetation — mostly thorny bushes — over a breadth of 70 miles. In Thal the whole land is arid and depends upon the weather conditions. They cultivate grains only.

It lies near the edge of Jhang district, on the boundaries of Bhakkar and Layyah districts. To the west is Bhareri  Union Council, to the north Khushab district. It has a population of almost 20,000.

It is 45 km from Jhang, 15 km from Hazari, 7 km from Bhareri and 31 km from Hyderabad Thall.

There is a Government Boys Elementary School and also a Girls Elementary School, as well as a rural dispensary. Its Union Council is Doosa.

Dhapra caste

There is only one caste in Chellay Wala, the Dhapra caste, which is considered the big caste of Doosa Union.

Important Dhapras in the village include Muhammad Khan Dhapra, Saith Jan Muhammad Dhapra, Councillor Sardar Hashmat Ullah Dhapra, and Rehmat Ullah Dhapra (Patwari), Ghulam Akber, Shah Nawaz Malang is a well-known local entertainer.

Sources

Villages in Jhang District